Abdul Kader Kamli, with more than 150 articles published in professional journals/magazines, is an authority on information and communication technology in the Arab world. He is often quoted by regional and international media organizations on the digital migration of the region.

In his capacity as president and Research Director of Madar Research Group, which he founded in 2002, Kamli has pioneered regional research and consultancy in the various fields of the emerging knowledge economy; from ICT adoption by governments, industry sectors and individuals, to e-learning, e-banking and other applications of ICT.

Prior to founding Madar Research Group, he co-founded Ajeeb.com, the largest Arab horizontal web portal at that time (based on Sakhr Software technology). In 2001 and while serving as General Manager of Ajeeb.com, Kamli founded the Ajeeb Research Unit, which specialized in researching the Arab knowledge economy and coined the idea for the first-ever Arab news aggregation services; Johaina.

Kamli is also co-founder of the Middle East edition of PC Magazine and founder of Internet Arab World magazine, published by the Dabbagh Information Technology Group (DIT), and he served a long tenure as Editor-in-Chief for both publications.

Kamli holds a university degree in Engineering, and has an experience of about 30 years in the ICT, media and research industries.

Research projects 
Qatar ICT Landscape 2009 (based on 14 field surveys)

Abu Dhabi e-Maturity 2008 (based on 13 field surveys)

Regional Profile of the Information Society in Western Asia (ESCWA 2007)

UAE Knowledge Economy 2006 

e-Government in Gulf Cooperation Council (GCC) -2005

e-Commerce in Gulf Cooperation Council (GCC) -2005

e-Banking in Gulf Cooperation Council (GCC) -2005

e-Learning in Gulf Cooperation Council (GCC) -2005

Dubai Knowledge Economy 2003-2008

Tens of other research studies in the field of ICT and Knowledge Economy

Articles written 
Statistical Irregularities and its Impact on Measuring the Information Society in the ESCWA Region (ICT Review publication, page 7)

Building a New Arabic Search Engine - Cultural Necessity and Success Factors

Per Capita Bandwidth and the Digital Divide in the Arab Countries

Oil Revenues and Knowledge Economy

A Millennium-Old Tradition of Knowledge Wasted

Toward Standard ICT Indicators for MENA

FDI-Based Innovation: A Priority for Arab Countries

Building a Research Culture in the Arab World

Two-Layer Literacy for Knowledge-Based Economy

Attracting Foreign Investment

Building Arab Innovation System Why and How

The Quest to Find a Role in the Digital Age

GCC Public Expenditure on Education

References 

Biography: Bionotes of Speakers, Chairs, and Panel Lists - UN-ESCWA 2009

Living people
Year of birth missing (living people)
Communication scholars
Mass media scholars
People in educational technology